The Oxford University Exploration Club was established in December 1927 by Edward Max Nicholson, Colin Trapnell, and Charles Sutherland Elton.

The Club's aim is to support and advise students with planning original expeditions abroad.  Recent expeditions to Tibet, the Congo, Greenland, Trinidad, Mongolia, Svalbard, Namibia, Papua New Guinea and the remote Comoros Islands have discovered new species of birds, insects and plants, published scientific papers on the rainforest canopy, found some of the world’s deepest caves, scaled unclimbed peaks and recorded the folk music of nomads; all in co-operation and collaboration with local people and organisations.

The Club was merged in 1965 with the Oxford University Women's Exploration Club (founded by Henrietta Hutton), with equal status granted for both male and female members.

Former members include:

Edward Shackleton, Baron Shackleton - Chairman 1932-33, member of the 1932 expedition to Sarawak in Borneo, organised by Tom Harrisson, along with the Oxford University Ellesmere Land Expedition (led by Gordon Noel Humphreys)
Wilfred Thesiger - Treasurer of the Club's Committee 1931-1932
Alex Hibbert 
John Buchan - President 1930 - 1934
Gerald Harvey Thompson - assistant entomologist on the 1938 expedition to the Cayman Islands
James Fisher (naturalist) - Junior Treasurer 1932-34
Andrew Croft - Oxford University Arctic Expedition, 1935–36
Kenneth Mason (geographer) - Vice President 1933 - 1938

Previous expeditions

Oxford University Greenland Expedition, 1928
Oxford University British Guiana Expedition, 1929
Oxford University Expedition to Lapland, 1930
Oxford University Hudson Strait Expedition, 1931
Oxford University Expedition to Sarawak (Borneo), 1932
Oxford University Arctic Expedition (Spitsbergen), 1933
Oxford University New Hebrides Expedition, 1933
Abyssinia Expedition, 1933
Oxford University Ellesmere Land Expedition, 1934–35
Oxford University Greenland Expedition 1935
Oxford University Arctic Expedition (North-East Land), 1935–36
Oxford University Greenland Expedition, 1936
The Faeroes Biological Expedition, 1937

Presidents
Carla V. Fuenteslópez, 2021–22
Emily Brannigan, 2020–21
Matt Jones, 2019–20
Isabel Carter, 2018–19
Will Hartz, 2016–17

References

Bibliography

 The Times July 15, 1935. pg. 15
 1928 - 1937 Annual Reports, Oxford University Exploration Club

External links
Oxford University Exploration Club website
 - OUEC catalogue held at the Bodleian Library (contact Archivist for access)

Student organizations established in 1927
Clubs and societies of the University of Oxford
Travelers organizations